Dan Smith (3 August 1873 – 1 May 1921) was a South African international rugby union player who played as a fullback.

References

1873 births
1921 deaths
South African rugby union players
South Africa international rugby union players
Sportspeople from Port Elizabeth
Rugby union fullbacks
Rugby union players from the Eastern Cape
Eastern Province Elephants players